Corporatism is a collectivist political ideology which advocates the organization of society by corporate groups, such as agricultural, labour, military, business, scientific, or guild associations, on the basis of their common interests. The term is derived from the Latin corpus, or "body". 

As originally conceived corporatism was meant to be an alternative to both free market economies and socialist economies. 
The hypothesis that society will reach a peak of harmonious functioning when each of its divisions efficiently performs its designated function, as a body's organs individually contribute to its general health and functionality, lies at the center of corporatist theory. 
Corporatism, socioeconomically is based on an organization called corporations, that it gets its name from. 

Corporatism does not refer to a political system dominated by large business interests, even though the latter are commonly referred to as "corporations" in modern American vernacular and legal parlance; instead, the correct term for this theoretical system would be corporatocracy. Corporatism is not government corruption in politics or the use of bribery by corporate interest groups. The terms corporatocracy and corporatism are often confused due to their name and the use of corporations as organs of the state.

Corporatism developed during the 1850s in response to the rise of classical liberalism and Marxism, as it advocated cooperation between the classes instead of class conflict. Corporatism became one of the main tenets of fascism, and Benito Mussolini's fascist regime in Italy advocated the collective management of the economy by state officials by integrating large interest groups under the state, which is a combination of crony capitalism and state capitalism; however, the more democratic neo-corporatism often embraced tripartism.

Corporatist ideas have been expressed since ancient Greek and Roman societies, with integration into Catholic social teaching and Christian democratic political parties. They have been paired by various advocates and implemented in various societies with a wide variety of political systems, including authoritarianism, absolutism, fascism and liberalism.

Kinship corporatism
Kinship-based corporatism emphasizing clan, ethnic and family identification has been a common phenomenon in Africa, Asia and Latin America. Confucian societies based upon families and clans in East Asia and Southeast Asia have been considered types of corporatism. China has strong elements of clan corporatism in its society involving legal norms concerning family relations. Islamic societies often feature strong clans which form the basis for a community-based corporatist society. Family businesses are common worldwide in capitalist societies.

Politics and political economy

Communitarian corporatism
Ancient Greece developed early concepts of corporatism. Plato developed the concept of a totalitarian and communitarian corporatist system of natural-based classes and natural social hierarchies that would be organized based on function, such that groups would cooperate to achieve social harmony by emphasizing collective interests while rejecting individual interests.

In Politics, Aristotle also described society as being divided along natural classes and functional purposes that were priests, rulers, slaves and warriors. Ancient Rome adopted Greek concepts of corporatism into their own version of corporatism but also added the concept of political representation on the basis of function that divided representatives into military, professional and religious groups and created institutions for each group known as collegia.

After the fall of Rome and the beginning of the Early Middle Ages corporatist organizations in Europe became largely limited to religious orders and the idea of Christian brotherhood especially within the context of economic transactions. From the High Middle Ages onward corporatist organizations became increasingly common in Europe including such groups as religious orders, monasteries, fraternities, military orders such as the Knights Templar and Teutonic Order, educational organizations such as the emerging universities and learned societies, the chartered towns and cities, and most notably the guild system which dominated the economies of population centers in Europe. The military orders notably gained increased support during the Crusades. These corporatist systems co-existed with the governing medieval estate system, and members of the first estate, the clergy, the second estate, the aristocracy, and third estate, the common people, could also participate in various corporatist bodies. The creation of the guild system involved the allocation of power to regulate trade and prices to guilds, whose members included artisans, tradesmen, and other professionals. This diffusion of power is an important aspect of corporatist economic models of economic management and class collaboration. However from the 16th century onward absolute monarchies began to conflict with the diffuse, decentralized powers of the medieval corporatist bodies. Absolute monarchies during the Renaissance and Enlightenment gradually subordinated corporatist systems and corporate groups to the authority of centralized and absolutist governments, removing any checks on royal power these corporatist bodies had previously utilized.

After the French Revolution, the existing absolutist corporatist system was abolished due to its endorsement of social hierarchy and special "corporate privilege". The new French government considered corporatism's emphasis on group rights as inconsistent with the government's promotion of individual rights. Subsequently corporatist systems and corporate privilege throughout Europe were abolished in response to the French Revolution. From 1789 to the 1850s, most supporters of corporatism were reactionaries. A number of reactionary corporatists favoured corporatism in order to end liberal capitalism and restore the feudal system. Counter to the reactionaries were the ideas of Henri de Saint-Simon whose proposed 'industrial class' would have had the representatives of various economic groups sit in the political chambers, in contrast to the popular representation of liberal democracy.

Progressive corporatism
From the 1850s onward, progressive corporatism developed in response to classical liberalism and Marxism. These corporatists supported providing group rights to members of the middle classes and working classes in order to secure cooperation among the classes. This was in opposition to the Marxist conception of class conflict. By the 1870s and 1880s, corporatism experienced a revival in Europe with the creation of workers' unions that were committed to negotiations with employers.

In his work Gemeinschaft und Gesellschaft ("Community and Society") of 1887, Ferdinand Tönnies began a major revival of corporatist philosophy associated with the development of neo-medievalism, increasing promotion of guild socialism and causing major changes to theoretical sociology. Tönnies claims that organic communities based upon clans, communes, families and professional groups are disrupted by the mechanical society of economic classes imposed by capitalism. The Nazis used Tönnies' theory to promote their notion of Volksgemeinschaft ("people's community"). However, Tönnies opposed Nazism and joined the Social Democratic Party of Germany in 1932 to oppose fascism in Germany and was deprived of his honorary professorship by Adolf Hitler in 1933.

Corporatism in the Roman Catholic Church
In 1881, Pope Leo XIII commissioned theologians and social thinkers to study corporatism and provide a definition for it. In 1884 in Freiburg, the commission declared that corporatism was a "system of social organization that has at its base the grouping of men according to the community of their natural interests and social functions, and as true and proper organs of the state they direct and coordinate labor and capital in matters of common interest". Corporatism is related to the sociological concept of structural functionalism.

Corporatism's popularity increased in the late 19th century and a corporatist internationale was formed in 1890, followed by the publishing of Rerum novarum by the Catholic Church that for the first time declared the Church's blessing to trade unions and recommended for organized labour to be recognized by politicians. Many corporatist unions in Europe were endorsed by the Catholic Church to challenge the anarchist, Marxist and other radical unions, with the corporatist unions being fairly conservative in comparison to their radical rivals. Some Catholic corporatist states include Austria under the leadership of Federal Chancellor Engelbert Dollfuss and Ecuador under the leadership of Garcia Moreno. The economic vision outlined in Rerum novarum and Quadragesimo anno also influenced the regime of Juan Perón and Justicialism in Argentina. In response to the Roman Catholic corporatism of the 1890s, Protestant corporatism was developed, especially in Germany, the Netherlands and Scandinavia. However, Protestant corporatism has been much less successful in obtaining assistance from governments than its Roman Catholic counterpart.

Corporate solidarism

Sociologist Émile Durkheim advocated a form of corporatism termed "solidarism" that advocated creating an organic social solidarity of society through functional representation. Solidarism was based upon Durkheim's view that the dynamic of human society as a collective is distinct from that of an individual, in that society is what places upon individuals their cultural and social attributes.

Durkheim posited that solidarism would alter the division of labour by evolving it from mechanical solidarity to organic solidarity. He believed that the existing industrial capitalist division of labour caused "juridical and moral anomie", which had no norms or agreed procedures to resolve conflicts and resulted in chronic confrontation between employers and trade unions. Durkheim believed that this anomie caused social dislocation and felt that by this "it is the law of the strongest which rules, and there is inevitably a chronic state of war, latent or acute". As a result, Durkheim believed it is a moral obligation of the members of society to end this situation by creating a moral organic solidarity based upon professions as organized into a single public institution.

Corporate solidarism is a form of corporatism that advocates creating solidarity instead of collectivism in society through functional representation, believing that it was up to the people to end the chronic confrontation between employers and labor unions by creating a single public institution. Solidarism rejects a materialistic approach to social, economic, and political problems, while also rejecting class conflict. Just like corporatism, it embraces tripartism as its economic system.

Liberal corporatism

The idea of liberal corporatism has also been attributed to English liberal philosopher John Stuart Mill who discussed corporatist-like economic associations as needing to "predominate" in society to create equality for labourers and give them influence with management by economic democracy. Unlike some other types of corporatism, liberal corporatism does not reject capitalism or individualism, but believes that the capitalist companies are social institutions that should require their managers to do more than maximize net income by recognizing the needs of their employees.

This liberal corporatist ethic is similar to Taylorism, but endorses democratization of capitalist companies. Liberal corporatists believe that inclusion of all members in the election of management in effect reconciles "ethics and efficiency, freedom and order, liberty and rationality".

Liberal corporatism began to gain disciples in the United States during the late 19th century. Economic liberal corporatism involving capital-labour cooperation was influential in Fordism. Liberal corporatism has also been an influential component of the progressivism in the United States that has been referred to as "interest group liberalism".

Fascist corporatism

A fascist corporation is a government body that brings together federations of workers and employers syndicates belonging to the same profession and branch, to regulate production in a holistic manner. Each trade union would theoretically represent its professional concerns, especially by negotiation of labour contracts and the like. It was theorized that this method could result in harmony amongst social classes.

In Italy from 1922 until 1943, corporatism became influential amongst Italian nationalists led by Benito Mussolini. The Charter of Carnaro gained much popularity as the prototype of a "corporative state", having displayed much within its tenets as a guild system combining the concepts of autonomy and authority in a special synthesis. Alfredo Rocco spoke of a corporative state and declared corporatist ideology in detail. Rocco would later become a member of the Italian fascist regime.

Italian Fascism involved a corporatist political system in which the economy was collectively managed by employers, workers and state officials by formal mechanisms at the national level. Its supporters claimed that corporatism could better recognize or "incorporate" every divergent interest into the state organically, unlike majority-rules democracy which they said could marginalize specific interests. This total consideration was the inspiration for their use of the term "totalitarian", described without coercion (which is connoted in the modern meaning) in the 1932 Doctrine of Fascism as thus: 

A popular slogan of the Italian Fascists under Mussolini was "Tutto nello Stato, niente al di fuori dello Stato, nulla contro lo Stato" ("everything within the state, nothing outside the state, nothing against the state").

Within the corporative model of Italian fascism each corporate interest was supposed to be resolved and incorporated under the state. Much of the corporatist influence upon Italian Fascism was partly due to the Fascists' attempts to gain endorsement by the Roman Catholic Church that itself sponsored corporatism. However, fascist corporatism was a top-down model of state control over the economy while the Roman Catholic Church's corporatism favored a bottom-up corporatism, whereby groups such as families and professional groups would voluntarily work together. The fascist state corporatism (of Roman Catholic Italy) influenced the governments and economies of not only other Roman Catholic-majority countries, such as the governments of Engelbert Dollfuss in Austria and António de Oliveira Salazar in Portugal, but also Konstantin Päts and Kārlis Ulmanis in non-Catholic Estonia and Latvia. Fascists in non-Catholic countries also supported Italian Fascist corporatism, including Oswald Mosley of the British Union of Fascists, who commended corporatism and said that "it means a nation organized as the human body, with each organ performing its individual function but working in harmony with the whole". Mosley also considered corporatism as an attack on laissez-faire economics and "international finance".

The corporatist state of Portugal had similarities to Benito Mussolini's Italian fascist corporatism, but also differences in its moral approach to governing. Although Salazar admired Mussolini and was influenced by his Labour Charter of 1927, he distanced himself from fascist dictatorship, which he considered a pagan Caesarist political system that recognised neither legal nor moral limits. Salazar also had a strong dislike of Marxism and liberalism.

In 1933, Salazar stated: "Our Dictatorship clearly resembles a fascist dictatorship in the reinforcement of authority, in the war declared against certain principles of democracy, in its accentuated nationalist character, in its preoccupation of social order. However, it differs from it in its process of renovation. The fascist dictatorship tends towards a pagan Caesarism, towards a state that knows no limits of a legal or moral order, which marches towards its goal without meeting complications or obstacles. The Portuguese New State, on the contrary, cannot avoid, not think of avoiding, certain limits of a moral order which it may consider indispensable to maintain in its favour of its reforming action".

Neo-corporatism
During the post-World War II reconstruction period in Europe, corporatism was favored by Christian democrats (often under the influence of Catholic social teaching), national conservatives and social democrats in opposition to liberal capitalism. This type of corporatism became unfashionable but revived again in the 1960s and 1970s as "neo-corporatism" in response to the new economic threat of recession-inflation.

Neo-corporatism is a democratic form of corporatism which favors economic tripartism, which involves strong labour unions, employers' associations and governments that cooperated as "social partners" to negotiate and manage a national economy. Social corporatist systems instituted in Europe after World War II include the ordoliberal system of the social market economy in Germany, the social partnership in Ireland, the polder model in the Netherlands (although arguably the polder model already was present at the end of World War I, it was not until after World War II that a social service system gained foothold there), the concertation system in Italy, the Rhine model in Switzerland and the Benelux countries and the Nordic model in Scandinavia.

Attempts in the United States to create neo-corporatist capital-labor arrangements were unsuccessfully advocated by Gary Hart and Michael Dukakis in the 1980s. As secretary of labor during the Clinton administration, Robert Reich promoted neo-corporatist reforms.

Contemporary examples by country

China

Chinese corporatism, as described by Jonathan Unger and Anita Chan in their essay China, Corporatism, and the East Asian Model, is the following: [A]t the national level the state recognizes one and only one organization (say, a national labour union, a business association, a farmers' association) as the sole representative of the sectoral interests of the individuals, enterprises or institutions that comprise that organization's assigned constituency. The state determines which organizations will be recognized as legitimate and forms an unequal partnership of sorts with such organizations. The associations sometimes even get channelled into the policy-making processes and often help implement state policy on the government's behalf.

By establishing itself as the arbiter of legitimacy and assigning responsibility for a particular constituency with one sole organization, the state limits the number of players with which it must negotiate its policies and co-opts their leadership into policing their own members. This arrangement is not limited to economic organizations such as business groups and social organizations.

The political scientist Jean C. Oi coined the term "local state corporatism" to describe China's distinctive type of state-led growth, in which a communist party-state with Leninist roots commits itself to policies which are friendly to the market and to growth.

The use of corporatism as a framework to understand the central state's behaviour in China has been criticized by authors such as Bruce Gilley and William Hurst.

Hong Kong and Macau
In two special administrative regions, some legislators are chosen by functional constituencies (Legislative Council of Hong Kong) where the voters are a mix of individuals, associations, and corporations or indirect election (Legislative Assembly of Macau) where a single association is designated to appoint legislators.

Ireland
Most members of the Seanad Éireann, the upper house of the Oireachtas (parliament) of Ireland, are elected as part of vocational panels nominated partly by current Oireachtas members and partly by vocational and special interest associations. The Seanad also includes two university constituencies.

The Netherlands
Under the Dutch Polder Model, the Social and Economic Council of the Netherlands (Sociaal-Economische Raad, SER) was established by the  1950 Industrial Organisation Act (Wet op de bedrijfsorganisatie). It is led by representatives of unions, employer organizations, and government appointed experts. It advises the government, and has administrative and regulatory power. It oversees Sectoral Organisation Under Public Law (Publiekrechtelijke Bedrijfsorganisatie, PBO) which are similarly organized by union and industry representatives, but for specific industries or commodities.

Russia
Post-Soviet Russia has been described as an oligarchy, a kleptocracy, and corporatist.

On October 9, 2007, an article signed by Viktor Cherkesov, head of the Federal Drug Control Service of Russia, was published in Kommersant, where he used the term "corporativist state" in a positive way to describe the evolution of Russia. He claimed that the administration officials detained on criminal charges earlier that month are the exception rather than the rule and that the only development scenario for Russia that is both realistic enough and relatively favorable is to continue evolution into a corporativist state ruled by security service officials.

In December 2005, Andrei Illarionov, former economic adviser to Vladimir Putin, claimed that Russia had become a corporativist state: The process of this state evolving into a new corporativist [sic] model reached its completion in 2005. [...] The strengthening of the corporativist state model and setting up favorable conditions for quasi-state monopolies by the state itself hurt the economy. ... Cabinet members or key Presidential Staff executives chairing corporation boards or serving on those boards are the order of the day in Russia. In what Western country—except in the corporativist state that lasted for 20 years in Italy—is such a phenomenon possible? Which, actually, proves that the term 'corporativist' properly applies to Russia today.

According to some researchers, all political powers and most important economic assets in the country are controlled by former state security officials (siloviks). The takeover of Russian state and economic assets has been allegedly accomplished by a clique of Putin's close associates and friends who gradually became a leading group of Russian oligarchs and who "seized control over the financial, media and administrative resources of the Russian state" and restricted democratic freedoms and human rights

Illarionov described the present situation in Russia as a new socio-political order, "distinct from any seen in our country before". In this model, members of the Corporation of Intelligence Service Collaborators (KSSS) took over the entire body of state power, follow an omertà-like behavior code and "are given instruments conferring power over others – membership 'perks', such as the right to carry and use weapons". According to Illarionov, the "Corporation has seized key government agencies – the Tax Service, Ministry of Defense, Ministry of Foreign Affairs, Parliament, and the government-controlled mass media – which are now used to advance the interests of KSSS members. Through these agencies, every significant resource of the country – security/intelligence, political, economic, informational and financial – is being monopolized in the hands of Corporation members".

Analyst Andrei Piontkovsky also considers the present situation as "the highest and culminating stage of bandit capitalism in Russia". He believes that "Russia is not corrupt. Corruption is what happens in all countries when businessmen offer officials large bribes for favors. Today’s Russia is unique. The businessmen, the politicians, and the bureaucrats are the same people."

Slovenia
The Slovene National Council, the upper house of the Slovene Parliament, has 18 members elected on a corporatist basis.

See also

 Class collaboration
 Co-determination
 Corporate nationalism
 Corporate statism
 Cooperative
 Distributism
 Fascism
 Gemeinschaft and Gesellschaft
 Gremialismo
 Guild
 Guild socialism
 Managerialism
 Mutualism (movement)
 Integralism
 National syndicalism
 Paritarian Institutions
 Pillarisation
 Solidarism (disambiguation)
 Third Position

Notes

References
 Black, Antony (1984). Guilds and civil society in European political thought from the twelfth century to present. Cambridge, United Kingdom: Cambridge University Press, .

Further reading
 Acocella, N. and Di Bartolomeo, G. [2007], "Is corporatism feasible?", in: Metroeconomica, 58(2): 340-59.
 Jones, Eric. 2008. Economic Adjustment and Political Transformation in Small States. Oxford University Press.
Jones, R. J. Barry. Routledge Encyclopedia of International Political Economy: Entries A-F. Taylor & Frances, 2001. .
Schmitter, P. (1974). "Still the Century of Corporatism?" The Review of Politics, 36(1), 85-131.
 Taha Parla and Andrew Davison, Corporatist Ideology in Kemalist Turkey Progress or Order?, 2004, Syracuse University Press,

On Italian corporatism
 Constitution of Fiume
 Rerum novarum: encyclical of Pope Leo XIII on capital and labor
 Quadragesimo Anno: encyclical of Pope Pius XI on reconstruction of the social order

On fascist corporatism and its ramifications
 Baker, David, "The political economy of fascism: Myth or reality, or myth and reality?", New Political Economy, Volume 11, Issue 2 June 2006, pages 227–250.
 Marra, Realino, "Aspetti dell'esperienza corporativa nel periodo fascista, Annali della Facoltà di Giurisprudenza di Genova, XXIV-1.2, 1991–92, pages 366–79.
 There is an essay on "The Doctrine of Fascism" credited to Benito Mussolini that appeared in the 1932 edition of the Enciclopedia Italiana, and excerpts can be read at Doctrine of Fascism. There are also links there to the complete text.
 My rise and fall, Volumes 1–2 – two autobiographies of Mussolini, editors Richard Washburn Child, Max Ascoli, Richard Lamb, Da Capo Press, 1998
 The 1928 autobiography of Benito Mussolini. Online.  My Autobiography. Book by Benito Mussolini; Charles Scribner's Sons, 1928. .

On neo-corporatism
 Katzenstein, Peter. Small States in World Markets: industrial policy in Europe. Ithaca, 1985. Cornell University Press. .
 Olson, Mancur. The Logic of Collective Action: Public Goods and the Theory of Groups.  1965, 1971. Harvard University Press. .
 Schmitter, P. C. and Lehmbruch, G. (eds.). Trends toward Corporatist Intermediation. London, 1979. .
 Rodrigues, Lucia Lima. "Corporatism, liberalism and the accounting profession in Portugal since 1755." Journal of Accounting Historians, June 2003.

External links

 Encyclopedias
 Corporatism – Encyclopædia Britannica
 Corporatism – The Canadian Encyclopedia
 Articles
 Professor Thayer Watkins, The economic system of corporatism , San Jose State University, Department of Economics.
 Chip Berlet, "Mussolini on the Corporate State", 2005, Political Research Associates.
 "Economic Fascism" by Thomas J. DiLorenzo, The Freeman, Vol. 44, No. 6, June 1994, Foundation for Economic Education; Irvington-on-Hudson, New York.

 
Collectivism
Economic ideologies
Fascism
Political systems
Political theories